This is a list of current and previous airports in the Greater Sydney area of New South Wales.



List of airports
The list is sorted by the name of the community served, click the sort buttons in the table header to switch listing order.

Inactive/Historic/Former airports

See also

List of airports in New South Wales

 
Sydney
Airports